The XI Constitutional Government of São Tomé and Príncipe (Portuguese: XI Governo Constitucional de São Tomé e Príncipe) was a government of São Tomé and Príncipe, established in April 2006 and disestablished in February 2008.

References

2006 establishments in São Tomé and Príncipe
Cabinets established in 2006
Government of São Tomé and Príncipe
Cabinets disestablished in 2008